John Ingham may refer to:

 John Ingham (footballer) (1924–2000), English footballer
 John Ingham (businessman) (1928–2003), Australian businessman
 John Ingham, English musical journalist, better known under his pseudonym Jonh Ingham